Chen Yile (born 5 January 2002) is an elite Chinese female artistic gymnast. She is the 2018 Asian all-around and balance beam champion, and the 2017 Asian junior all-around and uneven bars champion. She was a member of the team that won the bronze medal at the 2018 World Artistic Gymnastics Championships. Chen stars in the Olympic Channel documentary series "All Around", along with American gymnast Morgan Hurd and Russian gymnast Angelina Melnikova. The series shows her training and daily life as a 2020 Olympic hopeful.

Career

Junior 
Chen began gymnastics in 2010 at age eight, after being impressed by Yang Yilin's performance in the 2008 Beijing Olympics. Chen joined the national team in 2017. She competed at the 2017 Junior Asian Championships held in Bangkok, Thailand from May 16–21. At the Junior Asian Championships, Chen won all-around gold with a score of 55.000. Additionally, she won uneven bars gold (14.150), floor exercise silver (13.200) and balance beam bronze (12.925). She shared the podium with teammate Li Qi for floor and beam; Li was first on both events. Chen contributed to China's first-place finish as a team, scoring 161.100 alongside teammates Li Qi, Guo Fangting, Liu Jieyu, and Zhou Ruiyu.

Senior

2018 
Chen won three gold medals - team, all-around, and balance beam - at the 2018 Asian Games in August. Her all-around score was 55.950, which she achieved by placing first on balance beam and floor, third on uneven bars, and sixth on vault. In the all-around, she shared the podium with teammate Luo Huan, who won silver. In event finals, Chen scored 14.600 on balance beam, winning the gold. She placed third in uneven bars qualifications, behind teammates Liu Tingting and Luo Huan, so she was barred from competing in the finals due to the two-per-country rule. She was fifth in the floor exercise finals. She was recognized as "Best Female Athlete at the 2018 Asian Games" in October 2019.

In October at the 2018 Doha World Championships, Chen won a team bronze medal. She was seventh in the all-around, with a score of 54.632.

2019 
In October at the 2019 Stuttgart World Championships, Chen and her teammates - Liu Tingting, Tang Xijing, Li Shijia, and Qi Qi - posted the 2nd best team total on the first day of qualifications, but finished fourth in the team competition. This was the first time since 2003 that China did not reach the podium in the team event.

2020 
After the Tokyo 2020 Olympics were postponed due to the COVID-19 pandemic, Chen expressed her continuing motivation to train.

Personal life 
Chen enjoys drawing as a hobby. She has a younger sister, FeiFei, and an older brother, Feiyue.

Competitive history

References 

2002 births
Chinese female artistic gymnasts
Living people
Gymnasts at the 2018 Asian Games
Medalists at the 2018 Asian Games
Asian Games gold medalists for China
Asian Games medalists in gymnastics
Gymnasts from Jiangxi
People from Ganzhou
Medalists at the World Artistic Gymnastics Championships